
Grace Church (1835-1865) was an Episcopal church in Boston, Massachusetts, located in Beacon Hill, on Temple Street. The church operated for 30 years. Ministers included Thomas M. Clark (1836-1843); Clement Moore Butler (1844-1847); and Charles Mason (1848-1862; d.1862).

Architect William Washburn designed the church building in 1835. In 1851, Isaac Smith Homans said:The interior is beautifully painted by M. Bragaldi. The exterior of the building, including the towers (which are of the octagonal form), is 87 feet; breadth 68 feet. The basement is divided into 2 large rooms for lectures, Sunday-schools, &c. The height from the main floor above the basement to the centre of the main arch, is 45 feet; an arch is thrown over each of the side galleries, which is intersected by arches opposite the three windows on each side, and resting on each side upon four cluster columns of 24 inches diameter.

In 1865 the building was "sold to the Methodist Episcopal Society of North Russell Street."


Image gallery

References
Notes

Further reading
 American Magazine of Useful and Entertaining Knowledge, v.10, no.2, June 1836

Churches completed in 1835
19th-century Episcopal church buildings
1829 establishments in Massachusetts
1865 disestablishments
History of Boston
19th century in Boston
Beacon Hill, Boston
Churches in Boston